One Two Ka One is a Pakistani Urdu comedy film directed by musician-director Ronaq Ali.

Cast 
 Moammar Rana
 Reema
Nawaz Anjum
 Naseem Vicky
 Saima
 Babu Baral
 Irfan Khoosat
 Amanullah Khan
 Iftikhar Thakur

Production 
Shaan was initially given the title role but later it was given to Moammar Rana."

References 

2000s Urdu-language films
Pakistani comedy films
2006 comedy films
Urdu-language Pakistani films
Films scored by Wajid Nashad